This is a list of Belgian football transfers for the 2009–10 winter transfer window. Only transfers involving a team from the Jupiler League are listed.

The winter transfer window opens on 1 January 2010, although a few transfers may take place prior to that date. The window closes at midnight on 1 February 2010. Players without a club may join one, either during or in between transfer windows.

Sorted by date

September 2009

December 2009

 1 Ondřej Mazuch was already on loan from Fiorentina, now bought.
 2 Massimo Moia was on a season long loan since the summer 2009 transferperiod, but he was sent back by Sint-Truiden.

End of 2009
Several players were on a loan which ended in 2009. As of 1 January 2010, they returned to their original club and are listed here. For a list of players on loan during the last year, see List of Belgian football transfers winter 2008–09 and summer 2009.

January 2010

 3 Martínez was previously on loan to Vålerenga where his loan ended. After this Real España decided to loan him to Anderlecht.
 4 Perbet first signed a contract with Sint-Truiden on 29 December. On 5 January the news spread that although Perbet has already signed a contract, Sint-Truiden and Tubize were still negotiating when he would join Sint-Truiden. The latter were willing to wait until June, when his contract at Tubize was going to expire. Two days later on 7 January, Lokeren signed Perbet, causing disbelief and anger at Sint-Truiden. Perbet claims he only had a verbal contract at Sint-Truiden, while Sint-Truiden claim that they possess an official document which Perbet signed. If so, it is unsure how this will evolve. However, Perbet has since then played for Lokeren and it seems the case is closed.
 5 Mokulu has signed a four-year contract with Lokeren which will start in June 2010, but Lokeren and Oostende are still in negotiation as Lokeren would like to immediately sign him.
 6 Blažić' contract with Levadiakos only expires in June 2010, he will join Standard in the summer of 2010.
 7 Anderlecht wanted to loan Taylor to Charleroi, however Taylor had just recently signed for Anderlecht on 15 December 2009 and the rules of the Royal Belgian Football Association state that no player can be transferred more than once between teams within one season. Therefore, Anderlecht annulled the contract with Taylor, after which Charleroi immediately signed him to avoid him being seen as a transfer It is assumed that Taylor will return at the end of the season.

February 2010

Sorted by team

Anderlecht

In:

Out:

Cercle Brugge

In:

Out:

Charleroi

In:

Out:

Club Brugge

In:

Out:

Genk

In:

Out:

Gent

In:

Out:

Germinal Beerschot

In:

Out:

Kortrijk

In:

Out:

Lokeren

In:

 

Out:

Mechelen

In:

Out:

Mouscron
Note: because Mouscron was declared bankrupt on 28 December 2009, all players were released as their contracts were terminated. Berthelin was signed before the bankruptcy, but also released.

In:

Out:

Roeselare

In:

Out:

Sint-Truiden

In:

Out:

Standard Liège

In:

Out:

Westerlo

In:

Out:

Zulte Waregem

In:

Out:

References

Belgian
Transfers Winter
2009 Winter